The 2019-20 Zambia Super League is the 59th season of the Zambia Super League, the top-tier football league in Zambia. This is the first Super League season that has a new format which conforms with the CAF calendar. The league kicked off on 31 August.  Zesco United are the defending champions and KYSA and Kansashi Dynamos are the newly promoted sides into the super league. 
 
On 19 March 2020, the season was temporarily suspended by FAZ due to the effects of the COVID-19 pandemic. On 26 June, after nearly four months of the league's suspension, the FAZ announced that the league would resume on 18 July 2020 behind closed doors. The rescheduled matches would be played first, then the league will fully resume on 1 August 2020 with Round 26 fixtures and is scheduled to be completed on 30 August 2020.

Teams

League table

Results

Season statistics

Top scorers

References

External links
RSSSF

Zambia Super League
Super League
Zambia
Zambian Super League, 2019-20